The 2006 Norwegian Football Cup Final was the final match of the 2006 Norwegian Football Cup, the 101st season of the Norwegian Football Cup, the premier Norwegian football cup competition organized by the Football Association of Norway (NFF). The match was played on 12 November 2006 at the Ullevaal Stadion in Oslo, and opposed two Tippeligaen sides Fredrikstad and Sandefjord. Fredrikstad defeated Sandefjord 3–0 to claim the Norwegian Cup for an eleventh time in their history.

Route to the final

Match

Details

References

2006
Fredrikstad FK matches
Sandefjord Fotball matches
Football Cup
Sports competitions in Oslo
November 2006 sports events in Europe
2000s in Oslo
Final